was a Japanese princess who briefly served as honorary empress for her younger brother Emperor Go-Daigo.

Princess Shōshi was the daughter of Emperor Go-Uda and court lady Itsutsuji (Fujiwara) Chushi. She served as Saiō for her half-brother Emperor Go-Nijō from 1306 to 1308. She was named honorary Empress to her brother Emperor Go-Daigo in 1319. 

In the same year, Shōshi ordained as a Buddhist nun and was given the Dharma name Shinrikaku (真理覚).

Notes

Japanese empresses
1286 births
1348 deaths
Japanese Buddhist nuns
14th-century Buddhist nuns
Japanese princesses
Saigū
14th-century Japanese women writers